Chief Rabbi Chaim Madar was the chief rabbi of Tunisia's Jewish community, a community dating back to 586 BCE. He was the spiritual leader of this community until his death in Jerusalem on December 3, 2004. His funeral services were held at the Beit Mordechai Synagogue in La Goulette, Tunis, and the El Ghriba synagogue on the island of Djerba where he lived for most of his life. Among those extending their condolences was Tunisian President Zine El Abidine Ben Ali.

References

2004 deaths
20th-century Tunisian rabbis
21st-century Tunisian rabbis
Chief rabbis of Tunisia
Year of birth missing
People from Djerba

Tunisian emigrants to Israel